Comedy of Power is a 2006 French drama film directed by Claude Chabrol and starring Isabelle Huppert. The French title means "drunk with power". The film is loosely based on a true story involving the french former oil and gas company Elf Aquitaine and judge Eva Joly.

Plot
Humeau, head of a major state-owned company, is arrested for abuse of funds and interrogated by the implacable prosecutor, Jeanne Charmant-Killman. As she uncovers more and more hidden corruption, implicating politicians and foreign powers, both subtle and brutal methods are used to stop her. Intoxicated with the power of rooting out evil, her private life disintegrates and after an apparent suicide attempt her unhappy husband ends up in intensive care. At the hospital she sees Humeau, another man whose health is broken by his ordeal. The audience is left to wonder how many more victims she will amass or whether she will herself succumb to the increasing pressure.

Cast
 Isabelle Huppert as Jeanne Charmant-Killman
 François Berléand as Michel Humeau
 Patrick Bruel as Jacques Sibaud
 Marilyne Canto as Erika
 Robin Renucci as Philippe Charmant-Killman
 Thomas Chabrol as Félix
 Jean-François Balmer as Boldi
 Pierre Vernier as President Martino
 Jacques Boudet as Descarts
 Philippe Duclos as Jean-Baptiste Holéo
 Roger Dumas as René Lange
 Jean-Christophe Bouvet as Me Parlebas
 Jean-Marie Winling as The man of power
 Stéphane Debac as The cop
 Jacky Nercessian

See also
 Isabelle Huppert on screen and stage

References

External links

2006 films
2006 drama films
French drama films
2000s French-language films
Films directed by Claude Chabrol
2000s French films